May Rihani (born 1945 in Freike, Matn District, Lebanon) is an expert on girls' education and women's empowerment. She worked in over 40 countries and visited over 70 countries to advance these causes. She was a Senior Vice president of three leading US organizations that worked in International Development: FHI360, the Academy of Educational Development (AED), and Creative Associates International. She served as the Co-Chair of the United Nations Girls' Education Initiative  (UNGEI) between 2008 and 2010. She is a Lebanese writer and poet in both Arabic and English. She is also a women's rights activist. 

She assumed a position as director of the Kahlil Gibran Chair for Values and Peace at the University of Maryland, College Park, in early 2016. She is a candidate for the 2022 Lebanese presidential election, and has vowed to seek support from the opposition parties, independent MPs and the thirteen reformist deputies as well as the Lebanese diaspora.

Career 
In 2016, Rihani was appointed the director of the George and  Lisa Zakhem Kahlil Gibran Chair for Values of Peace at the University of Maryland. She served as director of the Gibran Chair for Values and Peace at the University of Maryland until 2020.

Published works
Rihani has published nine books and co-edited two.

In her English language books, she focuses on "addressing girl's education, woman's empowerment and global human development". Two of her major books are Learning for the 21st Century: Girl's Education in the Middle East and North Africa, which was translated by UNICEF to French, Arabic and Persian; and  Keeping the Promise: Five benefits of Girls Secondary Education. In addition, she authored Cultures Without Borders: From Beirut to Washington, D.C., a memoir.

The three Arabic books that she wrote are mainly poetry that discuss "love, Lebanon and global common ground". They are: Yalouffou Khasr al-Ard (Encircling the Waist of the Earth).;Ismi Siwaya (My Name Is The Other); Hafrun ’Ala Al-Ayyam (Engraving on Time)].

Tribute 
In tribute to Rihani's success and prosperous career, AUB established a scholarship fund called, "May Rihani Endowed Scholarship Fund". This fund is supported by Rihani's family, friends, and colleagues. The primary purpose of this fund is to provide financial assistance for outstanding woman at AUB.

Honors, awards and distinctions
 2019, "Femmes Partenaires du Progres" award
 2015, "ADC Women’s Empowerment Forum Leadership" award. 
 The Juliet Hollister Temple of Understanding Award:  New York, October 2012.
 Leadership Award of the Center for Women’s Leadership in International Development: Creative Associates International Inc., Washington, D.C., March 2012
 Legacy Award: Academy for Educational Development, Washington, D.C., June 2011.
 The Khalil Gibran International Award: University of Maryland, April 2008.
 Said Akl Award: Beirut, Lebanon, June 2004.
 Capital Area Peacemaker Award: School of International Service, American University, Washington, D.C., March 1998.

References

1945 births
Living people
20th-century Lebanese poets
21st-century Lebanese poets
Lebanese women poets
Lebanese women activists
Lebanese expatriates in the United States
20th-century American poets
American feminists
University of Maryland, College Park administrators
21st-century American poets
American women poets
20th-century American women
21st-century American women